Meara Conway; is a Canadian politician, who was elected to the Legislative Assembly of Saskatchewan in the 2020 Saskatchewan general election. She represents the electoral district of Regina Elphinstone-Centre as a member of the Saskatchewan New Democratic Party.

Political career 
During the 2020 Saskatchewan election Conway came under fire from the Saskatchewan Party over social media comments made in 2018 that implied an opposition to the Alberta oil sands. Party leader Ryan Meili subsequently addressed the comments and affirmed NDP support for oil and gas, while recognizing the need to invest in renewables sources of energy. Conway reiterated that she is "very concerned about the impacts of climate change" and applauded the NDP's "balanced approach" which she said includes "investments into renewable energy that would create sustainable, well-paying jobs for energy sector workers."

On November 4, 2020, Conway was named NDP critic for Social Services, Housing, Human Rights and Community-Based Organizations.

Personal life 
Prior to running for office, Conway was a public defender with Legal Aid Saskatchewan and was named one of Canadian Lawyer’s 25 Most Influential Lawyers of 2019 for her public interest work. Before going into law, she was an award-winning musician and remains a strong advocate for the arts.

Conway has deep roots in Saskatchewan. Her grandparents were active on the frontline for the battle for medicare, and founding members of the Saskatoon Community Clinic. Her grandfather, Ed Mahood was born on a farm in Grenfell, Saskatchewan and worked for years as a rural teacher before becoming a professor of Educational Foundations at the University of Saskatchewan.  He helped organize community clinics across the province and was the first chair of the Saskatoon Community Clinic Board, which pioneered “interdisciplinary community medicine” in Saskatchewan. He was known as one of the "peaceful generals in the grassroots struggle for Medicare."

Her grandmother, Dr. Margaret Mahood was born in Alameda, Saskatchewan and was among the first small group of women psychiatrists practicing in Canada. She was one of a few doctors who worked through the bitter Saskatchewan doctors' strike of 1962, resigning from her position at the North Battleford Hospital to join Dr. Joan Witney-Moore at the newly formed Saskatoon community clinic. Demand was great for services and the clinic was open until midnight in its first days. The strike was a significant test for Medicare and community clinics were key to undermining its effectiveness. The strike's failure allowed Medicare to continue and the Saskatchewan model was adopted throughout Canada within ten years.

Conway's mother, Dr. Sally Mahood, has practised family medicine in Regina for 40 years and is a longtime advocate for women's health. Conway's father, John Conway, is a retired sociology Professor at the University of Regina and served as a trustee for the Regina Public School Board undefeated for 18 years before he retired in 2009.

Electoral record

References

External links 

 Official website
 Meara Conway at the Saskatchewan New Democratic Party Caucus
 Meara Conway/ on Facebook
 Meara Conway on Twitter
 Meara Conway on Instagram

Living people
21st-century Canadian politicians
21st-century Canadian women politicians
Saskatchewan New Democratic Party MLAs
Politicians from Regina, Saskatchewan
21st-century Canadian lawyers
Year of birth missing (living people)
Public defenders